John Banks or Bankes may refer to:

Politics and law
Sir John Banks, 1st Baronet (1627–1699), English merchant and Member of Parliament
John Banks (U.S. politician) (1793–1864), U.S. Representative from Pennsylvania
John Gray Banks (1888–1961), politician in Canada
John Banks (activist) (1915–2010), English political activist and writer
John Banks (New Zealand politician) (born 1946), New Zealand politician
Sir John Bankes (1589–1644), Attorney General and Chief Justice to King Charles I of England
John Bankes (judge) (1854–1947), English judge
John Bankes (died 1772), British politician
John Eldon Bankes (1854–1946), Welsh judge
John Garnett Banks (1889–1974), Scottish businessman and local politician
John Bankes (died 1714), Member of Parliament 1698–1714 for Corfe Castle
John W. Banks (1867–1958), justice of the Connecticut Supreme Court

Sport
John Banks (cricketer) (1903–1979), New Zealand cricketer
John Banks (motorcyclist), British motocross racer
John Banks (baseball) (?–2011), Negro league baseball player
John Banks (footballer) (1875–1947), English footballer
Johnny Banks (1861–?), American boxer

Others
John Banks (playwright) (died 1706), English playwright of the Restoration era
John Banks (East India Company officer) (1811–1857), British officer
John Thomas Banks (1816–1908), Anglo-Irish physician
John Banks (drummer) (1943–1988), drummer for The Merseybeats
John Banks (mercenary recruiter) (1945–?), British mercenary recruiter

See also
John Bancks (1709–1751), writer
Jonathan Banks (born 1947), American character actor
John Anthony Banks (born 1955), San Jose City College Math Professor